Shruti Panwar (formerly Ulfat) is an Indian film and television actress. She hosted DD National's Stree Shakti and Saab Ji.

Filmography 
 Dil To Pagal Hai (1997)
 Sar Ankhon Par (1999)
 Yeh Hai Mumbai Meri Jaan (1999)
 Raaz (2002) Special Appearance in  Raaz Rambo
 Gafla (2006)
 Mr. X (2015)
 Sooryavanshi (2021)

Television
 I Love You (1998-1999)
 Saturday Suspense (1999)
 Dil Hai Ki Manta Nahin (1999) as Nikki
 Thoda Hai Thode Ki Zaroorat Hai (1998-1999)
 Rishtey (2000)
 Aaj Ke Shrimaan Shrimati (2004-2005) as Sania Sarfare
 Ishaan as Ishaan's mom (2010)
 Sasural Genda Phool as Rano Kashyap (2010 - 2012) 
  Mujhse Kuchh Kehti...Yeh Khamoshiyaan as Gauri Bhosle's adoptive mother (2012)
 Savdhaan India (episodic role)
 Naagarjuna - Ek Yoddha as Yashodha Shastri (2016-2017)
  Jamai Raja - Simran Raj Khurana
 Naamkarann as Shweta Khanna (2017 - 2018)
 Box Cricket League as herself captain of Lucknow Nawabs (2018)
 Dastaan-E-Mohabbat Salim Anarkali as Jhillan, Anarkali's aunt/foster mother (2018-2019)
  Nimki Vidhayak as leader of opposition, Ganga Devi. 
  Pinjara Khubsurti Ka as Vishaka 'Vish' (2021) 
Sasural Genda Phool 2 as Rano Kashyap (2021-2022) 
 Punyashlok Ahilyabai (2022-Present)

References

External links
 
 

Living people
Indian soap opera actresses
Year of birth missing (living people)
Actresses in Hindi cinema